Saepiseuthes chilensis is a species of beetle in the family Cerambycidae. It was described by Thomson in 1868. It is known from Chile.

References

Forsteriini
Beetles described in 1868
Endemic fauna of Chile